Government College, Koraput is a State Government-run degree college affiliated to Berhampur University.  It is situated in Landiguda, Koraput, Odisha state of India. It offers graduate courses in Arts, Commerce and Science stream. It also offers Master courses for Arts stream in two subjects that is Oriya and Education.

The College was established in 1968 by the Dayanand Anglo-Vedic College Management Committee in collaboration with the Education Development Society of Koraput.  It was taken over by the Government of Orissa in 1982, expanded to offer bachelor's and master's degrees. Govt of Odisha, Department of Higher education on 6-12-2012 notified in an extra ordinary Gazette Publication issue  that the DAV college is renamed as "Government college, Koraput (with effect from 10-07-1982 ).

See also

 Department of Higher Education, Odisha
 Vikram Deb Autonomous College, Jeypore, Koraput

References

Department of Higher Education, Odisha
Universities and colleges in Odisha
Koraput district
Educational institutions established in 1968
1968 establishments in Orissa